Awami Tahreek or Qomi Awami Tehreek, formerly Sindhi Awami Tahreek, is a Marxist–Leninist–Maoist political party based in the Pakistani province of Sindh, and headquartered in Hyderabad.

Formation 
Awami Tahreek was formed on 5 March 1970, by the leading writers, activists, and intellectuals in Hyderabad, Sindh. At the first party meeting, the leading theoretician Rasool Bux Palijo was elected as its first general secretary. It has gradually evolved into a national party and supported the anti-feudal elements against the PPP-P and PML-N in Sindh and Western Punjab; Awami Tahreek and PTI are the two main parties supporting anti-feudal-lordism and social democratic ideals in the country.

History 

Awami Tahreek has supported movements including:

 Neelam Band Karyo Movement
 Sindhi Voter Lists Movement 
 MRD 
 Journalist Movement 
 Anti-Urban Terrorism Movement and 
 Anti-Kalabagh Dam and Thal Canal Movement

Recently, Awami Tahreek has started to create local/regional offices in other provinces, and has broadened its political philosophy from a provincial to a national level.

Split into AT and QAT 
In 2013, Awami Tehreek was later renamed as Qaumi Awami Tehreek (QAT) and Rasul Bux Palijo's son Ayaz Latif Palijo became its central leader but however, in 2016, due to some internal rifts between  Rasul Bux Palijo and Ayaz Latif Palijo, Rasul Bux Palijo announced to revive Awami Tehreek again as a separate faction distancing from his son led QAT.

Ideology 

Awami Tahreek is a political party devoted to non-violence in its democratic struggle to attain freedom of the people through the scientific and revolutionary tenets of Marxism–Leninism–Maoism. It is committed to people's democracy, economic and social justice, and establishment of a welfare state in a country where people can have equity, political freedom, economic opportunity, and genuine provincial autonomy.

Its platform is that a comprehensive overhauling of society is required in order to deliver the benefits of a welfare state to the masses. Awami Tahreek stands for equal rights for all citizens without distinction of sex, class, color, language, faith, or creed.

Awami Tahreek is strict in opposing capitalism, imperialism, army rule, dictatorships, terrorism, corruption, racism, gender discrimination, and religious bigotry. Awami Tahreek promises to replace feudalism with principles of socialism to protect and advance the interests of peasantry.

Awami Tahreek continues to champion the cause of the unity of Pakistan in general and Sindh in particular, the caste system, communities, minorities, and ethnic groups. Since the foundation of the party, it has come forward as a builder of Muslim-Hindu-Christian unity.

Political movements 
Awami Tahreek opposed the division of Sindh, holding a "Mohabbat Sindh Rally" (love and sanctity of Sindh Dharti) against the division.

See also 
 Fazil Rahu
 Hyder Bux Jatoi
 Sindhiani Tahreek
 Zarina Baloch
 Sindh Hari Committee

References

External links 
 

Communist parties in Pakistan
Communism in Pakistan
Maoist parties
Progressive parties in Pakistan
Secularism in Pakistan
Socialism in Pakistan
Socialist parties in Pakistan
Maoism in Asia